Central Moncton is a neighbourhood in Moncton, New Brunswick, Canada.  Its boundaries include Vaughan Harvey to the West, Connaught Ave and Wheeler Blvd to the North and Botsford Street to the East with John St and Mountain Road to the south.

History
See History of Moncton and Timeline of Moncton history

Places of note

Notable people

See also
List of neighbourhoods in Moncton

Bordering communities

References

Neighbourhoods in Moncton